Sheffield Hallam is a constituency represented in the House of Commons of the UK Parliament since 2019 by Olivia Blake of the Labour Party.

The Hallam seat was previously held by Nick Clegg, the former Leader of the Liberal Democrats and Deputy Prime Minister of the United Kingdom until he was unseated by Labour in 2017.

Constituency profile
Sheffield Hallam is the only constituency in South Yorkshire that has not been a Labour stronghold, returning a Labour MP for the first time in 2017. Apart from a brief period between 1916 and 1918, when it was taken by the Liberals, it was a Conservative seat from 1885 until 1997, when the Liberal Democrats won it. This long period of Conservative dominance included all three elections under Margaret Thatcher's premiership, starkly contrasting with most seats in the county and the neighbouring county of Derbyshire.

On income-based 2004 statistics, this is the most affluent constituency one place below the top ten seats of the 650, which were spread across the South East of England (including London), with almost 12% of residents earning over £60,000 a year. This measure placed Sheffield Hallam above Windsor and Twickenham.

Based on 2011–12 income and tax statistics from HMRC, Sheffield Hallam has the 70th highest median income of the 650 parliamentary constituencies, with those above it almost exclusively in London and the South East, and placing it above Tunbridge Wells (76th), The Cotswolds (92nd), Cambridge (97th), Hemel Hempstead (103rd), and David Cameron's former Witney constituency (121st).

The 2001 Census showed Hallam to have the highest number of people classified as professionals of any of the UK constituencies. Furthermore, 60% of working-age residents hold a degree, the 7th highest and exceeding Cambridge.

Before the 1997 general election, the constituency was a safe Conservative seat, and was the only Conservative seat in South Yorkshire in the three previous elections to that. From 2005 to 2017, it was represented in the House of Commons by Nick Clegg, who was leader of the Liberal Democrats from 2007 to 2015 and Deputy Prime Minister from 2010 to 2015.

Hallam constituency extends from Stannington and Loxley in the north to Dore in the south and includes small parts of the city centre in the east. It includes the wards of Crookes, Dore and Totley, Ecclesall, Fulwood and Stannington.

The majority of Hallam is rural, spreading in the west into the Peak District National Park. It also contains some of the least deprived wards in the country, has low unemployment (1.5% jobseekers claimants in November 2012) and a high rate of owner occupancy, with few occupants who rent their home. Since the 2010 boundary changes, neither of Sheffield's universities have a campus in the constituency but it still includes areas where many students live.

In the 2017 general election, the Labour Party candidate, Jared O'Mara, won the seat from Clegg. This was the first time in the seat's history that it had returned a Labour MP.

From 25 October 2017 until 3 July 2018, O'Mara had the whip withdrawn as a Labour MP and sat as an independent. It was later restored but he quit the Labour Party shortly afterwards. He then sat as an independent MP until leaving parliament. O'Mara announced he would resign as an MP in September 2019, citing mental health issues, which would have triggered a by-election in the constituency. However, he later postponed his resignation until the 2019 general election.

Olivia Blake won the seat for the Labour Party in the 2019 general election. In her maiden speech to Parliament, Blake said that the Sheffield Hallam constituency had a "very long history of social justice", as mythology points to a Yorkshire origin for Robin Hood in Loxley, thereby lending her support to the idea that Loxley was the birthplace of Robin Hood.

Boundaries

1885–1918: The Borough of Sheffield wards of Nether and Upper Hallam, and parts of the wards of Ecclesall and St George's.

1918–1950: The County Borough of Sheffield wards of Crookesmoor and Hallam, and part of Broomhill ward.

1950–1955: The County Borough of Sheffield wards of Broomhill, Ecclesall, and Hallam.

1955–1974: The County Borough of Sheffield wards of Broomhill, Crookesmoor, Ecclesall, and Hallam.

1974–1983: The County Borough of Sheffield wards of Broomhill, Dore, Ecclesall, Hallam, and Nether Edge.

1983–1997: The City of Sheffield wards of Broomhill, Dore, Ecclesall, Hallam, and Nether Edge.

1997–2010: The City of Sheffield wards of Broomhill, Dore, Ecclesall, and Hallam.

2010–present: The City of Sheffield wards of Crookes, Dore and Totley, Ecclesall, Fulwood, and Stannington.

Hallam borders High Peak, North East Derbyshire, Penistone and Stocksbridge, Sheffield Central, Sheffield Heeley and Sheffield Brightside and Hillsborough.

History
Prior to its creation Hallam was a part of the larger Sheffield Borough constituency, which was represented by two Members of Parliament (MPs). In 1885 the Redistribution of Seats Act, which sought to eliminate constituencies with more than one MP and for the first time allow approximately equal representation of the people, led to the break-up of the constituency into five divisions: each represented by a single MP, as today. Hallam was one of these new divisions. Its first MP, the Conservative Charles Stuart-Wortley, had previously been an MP in the Sheffield constituency, elected for the first time in 1880.

Hallam was regarded in 2004 as the wealthiest constituency in the north of England and was held by the Conservative Party for all but two years from 1885 to 1997. At the 1997 general election, Richard Allan of the Liberal Democrats took the seat with an 18.5% swing, becoming only the second non-Tory ever to win it. He handed the seat to fellow Lib Dem and future UK Deputy Prime Minister, Nick Clegg in 2005; who held it until his defeat by Labour's Jared O'Mara at the 2017 snap general election. That year saw the constituency record its highest turnout in 66 years, with 77.8% of the electorate going to the polls.

Constituency polls during the 2010–2015 Parliament
Due in part to the high profile of the constituency's then-MP Nick Clegg, who served as Deputy Prime Minister during the 2010–15 Parliament, Sheffield Hallam is unusual in having had seven constituency-specific opinion polls conducted between 2010 and 2015. Each of these polls suggested significant changes in the vote share compared to 2010 general election. The first poll, in October 2010, suggested a drop in the Lib Dem lead in the seat to just 2%, from nearly 30% at the general election five months earlier. Five of the six remaining polls, which appeared between May 2014 and May 2015, suggested that Labour was in the lead in the seat by this time, with the Labour lead fluctuating to between 1% and 10%, and one put the Lib Dems in the lead. On average across all seven opinion polls, Labour had a lead over the Lib Dems of 2.5%. The Conservatives came second in one poll, and third in the other six polls. The May 2015 ICM poll scores displayed are those of the constituency voting intention question. The same poll also carried the standard voting intention question, which showed a Labour lead.

Members of Parliament

Elections

Elections in the 2010s

In 2010, Sheffield Hallam was one of a number of constituencies that experienced problems on polling day leading to some people being unable to cast their vote. In this case, voters at the Ranmoor polling station were subjected to long queues and some voters were turned away when polls closed at 10 pm, with Liberal Democrat candidate Nick Clegg apologising to those voters affected. Acting Returning Officer John Mothersole said that staff had been "caught out" by a high turnout, and the Electoral Commission instigated a review of procedures in Hallam and other constituencies where similar problems had occurred.

Elections in the 2000s

Elections in the 1990s

Elections in the 1980s

Elections in the 1970s

Elections in the 1960s

Elections in the 1950s

Elections in the 1940s

Elections in the 1930s

Elections in the 1920s

Elections in the 1910s

1916 by-election
This followed the resignation of Charles Stuart-Wortley on 16 December. Herbert Fisher of the Liberal Party was elected unopposed, becoming Hallam's first non-Unionist MP.

Elections in the 1900s

Elections in the 1890s

Elections in the 1880s

See also
 List of parliamentary constituencies in South Yorkshire
 Opinion polling for the next United Kingdom general election in individual constituencies

Notes

References

External links
 Vote 2001 – Sheffield Hallam BBC News
 Election 2005 – Sheffield Hallam BBC News
 Election history – Sheffield Hallam The Guardian
 
 Political Science Resources Election results from 1951 to the present
 F. W. S. Craig, British Parliamentary Election Results 1918 – 1949
 F. W. S. Craig, British Parliamentary Election Results 1950 – 1970
 Sheffield General Election Results 1945 – 2001, Sheffield City Council
 UK Constituency Maps

Hallam
Constituencies of the Parliament of the United Kingdom established in 1885